DWG may refer to:
 .dwg, a file format used by CAD packages etc.
 Distillers wet grains, a by-product of distillation
 Digital waveguide, in the digital waveguide synthesis of audio
 Order of Great Victory of the Thunder Dragon, a Bhutanese award (post-nominal letters: DWG)
 Part of the Gunashli oilfield in the Caspian Sea
 Deisel-Wemmer-Gilbert Corporation, a cigar company, a predecessor of The Wendy's Company fast food holding company
 Delaware Water Gap, geographical feature on the Delaware River, United States
 Damwon Gaming, a Korean esports organisation